A chrysalis is the pupa stage of a butterfly.

Chrysalis may also refer to:

Literature 
 Chrysalis (magazine), a feminist publication
 Chrysalis (sci-fi anthology), published 1977-1983
 "Chrysalis" (short story), by Ray Bradbury, published in S Is for Space
 Chrysalis (Wild Cards), a character from the Wild Cards series of books
 Chrysalis, a character in DC Comics

Music
 Chrysalis (Angunn album), a 2000 album by Indonesian singer Anggun
 Chrysalis (Tia Gostelow album), a 2020 album by Tia Gostelow
 Chrysalis (EP), a 2016 EP by I.O.I
 Chrysalis Group, a UK music and publishing company
 Chrysalis Music, a British independent music publisher
 Chrysalis Records, a record label
 "Chrysalis", a song by the Cherry Poppin' Daddies from Rapid City Muscle Car
 "Chrysalis", a bonus track by Snarky Puppy from the album Immigrance

Television and film 
 Chrysalis (2007 film), a French science fiction film directed by Julien Leclercq
 Chrysalis (2011 film), a Spanish drama film
 "Chrysalis" (Babylon 5), a 1994 episode of the science fiction series
 "Chrysalis" (Star Trek: Deep Space Nine), season seven episode of Star Trek: Deep Space Nine
 Ray Bradbury's Chrysalis, a 2008 adaptation of the short story
 Queen Chrysalis, a character in My Little Pony: Friendship Is Magic

Other uses 
 Chrysalis (boarding school), an all-girl small therapeutic boarding school located in Montana
 Chrysallis (gastropod), a genus of terrestrial snails
 Chrysalis (moon), hypothesized former moon of Saturn that broke up to form its rings
 Chrysalis (sculpture), a 1990 public artwork by Beth Sahagian
 Chrysalis School (Woodinville, WA), a US private school
 , a Greek steamship in service 1911-17
 Chrysalis, a nationwide nonprofit organization, see director and board member Brett Ratner
 Chrysalis, a youth and young adult Methodist education program similar to the Catholic Cursillo
 MIT Chrysalis human-powered aircraft; see traditions and student activities at MIT

See also